The 1934 Arkansas Razorbacks football team represented the University of Arkansas in the Southwest Conference (SWC) during the 1934 college football season. In their sixth year under head coach Fred Thomsen, the Razorbacks compiled a 4–4–2 record (2–3–1 against SWC opponents), finished in fifth place in the SWC, and outscored their opponents by a combined total of 95 to 76.

Schedule

References

Arkansas
Arkansas Razorbacks football seasons
Arkansas Razorbacks football